The geography of Malta is dominated by water. Malta is an archipelago of coralline limestone, located in the Mediterranean Sea, 81 kilometres south of Sicily, Italy, and nearly 300 km north (Libya) and northeast (Tunisia) of Africa. Although Malta is situated in Southern Europe, it is located farther south than Tunis, capital of Tunisia, Algiers, capital of Algeria, Tangier in Morocco and also Aleppo in Syria, and Mosul in Iraq in the Middle East. Only the three largest islands – Malta, Gozo and Comino – are inhabited. Other (uninhabited) islands are: Cominotto, Filfla and the St.Paul's Islands. The country is approximately 316 km2 (122 sq mi) in area. Numerous bays along the indented coastline of the islands provide harbours. The landscape of the islands is characterised by high hills with terraced fields. The highest point, at 253 metres, Ta' Zuta on mainland Malta. The capital is Valletta.

Statistics 
Malta has a total area of 315.718 km2, with land making up 315.718 km2 and water taking up zero area. Compared to other political entities, this makes Malta:
 (Australia) slightly less than one-seventh the Australian Capital Territory's size;
 (Canada) roughly one-eighteenth Prince Edward Island's size;
 (UK) slightly smaller than the Isle of Wight;
 (US) slightly less than twice the size of Washington, DC.
Excluding 56 km from the island of Gozo, Malta has a coastline of 196.8 km.

Islands

Climate 

Mediterranean with mild, rainy winters and hot, dry summers.

Elevation extremes 
The lowest point is the Mediterranean Sea at 0 m and the highest point is Ta' Dmejrek at 253 m.

Land use 
 Arable land: 28.12%
 Permanent crops: 4.06%
 Other: 67.81% (2011)

Irrigated land 
32 km2 (2007)

Total renewable water resources 

0.05 km3 (2011)

Environment

Current issues 
Limited natural fresh water resources; increasing reliance on desalination.

International Agreements 
 Party to: Air Pollution, Biodiversity, Climate Change, Climate Change-Kyoto Protocol, Desertification, Endangered Species, Law of the Sea, Marine Dumping, Ozone Layer Protection, Ship Pollution, Wetlands
signed, but not ratified:

References